The San Diego Padres are a Major League Baseball (MLB) franchise based in San Diego, California. The Padres currently compete in the National League (NL) West division. Since the institution of MLB's Rule 4 Draft, the Padres have selected 73 players in the first round. Officially known as the "First-Year Player Draft", the Rule 4 Draft is MLB's primary mechanism for assigning players from high schools, colleges, and other amateur clubs to its franchises. The draft order is determined based on the previous season's standings, with the team possessing the worst record receiving the first pick. In addition, teams which lost free agents in the previous off-season may be awarded compensatory or supplementary picks. The First-Year Player Draft is unrelated to the 1968 expansion draft in which the Padres initially filled their roster.

Of the 73 players picked in the first round by San Diego, 32 have been pitchers, the most of any position; 20 of these were right-handed, while 12 were left-handed. Fourteen outfielders were selected, while ten shortstops, seven catchers, five third basemen, and four first basemen were taken as well. The team has also drafted one player at second base. Eleven of the players came from high schools or universities in the state of California, and Florida and Georgia follow with ten and six players, respectively.

None of the Padres' first-round picks have won a World Series championship with the team. None of these picks have won the MLB Rookie of the Year award, although Khalil Greene (2002) placed second in the voting in 2004. Dave Winfield (1973) is the only first-round pick of the Padres in the Baseball Hall of Fame, inducted in 2001 as an outfielder. Drafted as a pitcher, Winfield was named to 12 All-Star teams, won 7 Gold Gloves and 6 Silver Sluggers, and finished as high as third in MVP award voting (in 1979) over the course of his 22-season career.

The Padres have made 21 selections in the supplemental round of the draft. They have also made the first overall selection five times (1970, 1972, 1974, 1988, and 2004), tied for the most such picks with the New York Mets. They have also had 24 compensatory picks since the institution of the First-Year Player Draft in 1965. These additional picks are provided when a team loses a particularly valuable free agent in the previous off-season, or, more recently, if a team fails to sign a draft pick from the previous year. The Padres have failed to sign two of their first-round picks, Karsten Whitson (2010) and Brett Austin (2011), and received the 10th pick in 2011 and 55th pick in 2012 as compensation.

Key

Picks

See also
San Diego Padres minor league players

Footnotes
Free agents are evaluated by the Elias Sports Bureau and rated "Type A", "Type B", or not compensation-eligible. If a team offers arbitration to a player but that player refuses and subsequently signs with another team, the original team may receive additional draft picks. If a "Type A" free agent leaves in this way his previous team receives a supplemental pick and a compensation pick from the team with which he signs. If a "Type B" free agent leaves in this way his previous team receives only a supplemental pick.
The Padres gained a compensatory first-round pick in 1979 from the Los Angeles Dodgers for losing free agent Derrel Thomas.
The Padres gained a compensatory first-round pick in 1981 from the New York Yankees for losing free agent Dave Winfield.
The Padres gained a supplemental first-round pick in 1984 for losing free agent Ruppert Jones.
The Padres gained a compensatory first-round pick in 1985 from the New York Yankees for losing free agent Ed Whitson.
The Padres lost their first-round pick in 1989 as compensation for signing free agent Bruce Hurst.
The Padres gained a compensatory first-round pick in 1990 from the Kansas City Royals for losing free agent Mark Davis.
The Padres gained a supplemental first-round pick in 1990 for losing free agent Mark Davis.
The Padres gained a supplemental first-round pick in 1991 for losing free agent Jack Clark.
The Padres lost their first-round pick in 1992 as compensation for signing free agent Kurt Stillwell.
The Padres gained a compensatory first-round pick in 1999 from the Los Angeles Dodgers as compensation for losing free agent Kevin Brown.
The Padres gained a compensatory first-round pick in 1999 from the Houston Astros as compensation for losing free agent Ken Caminiti.
The Padres gained a supplemental first-round pick in 1999 for losing free agent Kevin Brown.
The Padres gained a supplemental first-round pick in 1999 for losing free agent Ken Caminiti.
The Padres gained a supplemental first-round pick in 1999 for losing free agent Steve Finley.
The Padres gained a supplemental first-round pick in 2005 for losing free agent David Wells.
The Padres gained a supplemental first-round pick in 2006 for losing free agent Ramón Hernández.
The Padres gained a supplemental first-round pick in 2007 for losing free agent Woody Williams.
The Padres gained a supplemental first-round pick in 2007 for losing free agent Dave Roberts.
The Padres gained a supplemental first-round pick in 2007 for losing free agent Chan Ho Park.
The Padres gained a supplemental first-round pick in 2007 for losing free agent Alan Embree.
The Padres gained a supplemental first-round pick in 2007 for losing free agent Ryan Klesko.
The Padres gained a supplemental first-round pick in 2008 for losing free agent Doug Brocail.
The Padres gained a supplemental first-round pick in 2008 for losing free agent Mike Cameron.
The Padres gained a supplemental first-round pick in 2011 for failing to sign 2010 draft pick Karsten Whitson.
The Padres gained a supplemental first-round pick in 2011 for losing free agent Jon Garland.
The Padres gained a supplemental first-round pick in 2011 for losing free agent Yorvit Torrealba.
The Padres gained a supplemental first-round pick in 2011 for losing free agent Kevin Correia.
The Padres gained a supplemental first-round pick in 2012 for losing free agent Heath Bell.
The Padres gained a supplemental first-round pick in 2012 for losing free agent Aaron Harang.
The Padres gained a supplemental first-round pick in 2012 for failing to sign 2011 draft pick Brett Austin.

References
General references

In-text citations

First-round draft picks
Major League Baseball first-round draft picks